The 1991–92 Edmonton Oilers season was the Oilers' 13th season in the National Hockey League (NHL), and they were coming off a third-round playoff appearance in 1990–91, losing to the Minnesota North Stars in the Campbell Conference finals.

Prior to the season, the Oilers were involved in a couple of blockbuster deals, the first one occurring on September 19, as Edmonton traded Grant Fuhr, Glenn Anderson, and Craig Berube to the Toronto Maple Leafs in exchange for Vincent Damphousse, Peter Ing, Scott Thornton, and Luke Richardson. A little over two weeks later, the Oilers then dealt Mark Messier to the New York Rangers for Bernie Nicholls, Steven Rice, and Louie DeBrusk. Edmonton also named Ted Green as head coach as John Muckler left the Oilers for a job with the Buffalo Sabres.

Vincent Damphousse was the Oilers leader offensively, scoring a team high 38 goals and 51 assists for 89 points. Joe Murphy had a solid season, earning 82 points. Bernie Nicholls missed 31 games due to injury but recorded 49 points in the 49 games he played in. Defensively, Dave Manson anchored the blueline, leading all defensemen with 15 goals and 47 points and led the club in penalty minutes with 220. Fellow blueliner Norm MacIver earned 40 points in 59 games.

In goal, Bill Ranford appeared in 67 of the Oilers 80 games, winning 27 of them, and he posted a GAA of 3.58, and he earned a shutout along the way.

In the playoffs, the Oilers faced against Wayne Gretzky and the Los Angeles Kings, who finished two points ahead of Edmonton in the standings. The teams split the first four games, before Edmonton took control of the series, winning Game 5 in LA and taking the series with a solid 3–0 win in Game 6. The Oilers faced the regular season division champion Vancouver Canucks in the second round, and after splitting the opening two games in Vancouver, the Oilers won the next two games at home to take a 3–1 series lead. The Oilers lost Game 5 in Vancouver but won the series at home in the sixth game, setting up a matchup against the Chicago Blackhawks for the Campbell Conference championship. Chicago proved too much for the Oilers to handle, as Chicago swept the series, outscoring Edmonton 21–8.

This was be the Oilers' eighth conference final appearance in 10 years, and their third in a row. However, the Oilers did not advance this far in the playoffs again until 2006.

Season standings

Schedule and results

Playoffs

Edmonton Oilers 4, Los Angeles Kings 2

Edmonton Oilers 4, Vancouver Canucks 2

Chicago Blackhawks 4, Edmonton Oilers 0

Season stats

Scoring leaders

Goaltending

Playoff stats

Scoring leaders

Goaltending

Awards and Records

Awards

Records
 1,081: A new Oilers record for most penalty minutes in a career by defenceman by Kevin Lowe on October 8, 1991.

Transactions

Trades

Free agents

Draft picks
Edmonton's draft picks at the 1991 NHL Entry Draft, the Oilers had two picks in the first round as part of the Wayne Gretzky trade.

References

 National Hockey League Guide & Record Book 2007

Edmonton Oilers season, 1991-92
Edmon
Edmonton Oilers seasons